Aly Kassam-Remtulla (also known as Aly Remtulla) is a U.S.-based academic, writer and scholar who is Associate Provost for International Affairs and Operations at Princeton University. Previously, he was associated with the MacArthur Foundation.

Career 
Kassam-Remtulla was born in Kenya and grew up in Canada.  He received his undergraduate degree in Biological Sciences, Asian American Studies and Anthropology from Stanford University. He then studied as a Rhodes Scholar at Balliol College, where he received a master's degree, MBA, and doctorate from Oxford University.

Kassam-Remtulla's academic research and teaching concerns immigrant Muslim communities and has been widely cited by scholars of Ismailism, Islam, and those with interests in African Studies. He is a published poet and his writing has appeared in journalism at WIRED, Al Jazeera, and Stanford Magazine.

He is presently working as Associate Provost for International Affairs and Operations at Princeton University. Earlier, he worked on advancing diversity for graduate students and faculty members at Princeton and efforts to support Puerto Rico after Hurricane Maria. He co-founded the Faculty Advancement Network, a national consortium to promote diversity and inclusion in the professoriate community. Kassam-Remtulla has served on numerous non-profit boards and is the chair of the board of trustees at the Mpala Research Centre in Kenya.

He has been awarded the Duke of Edinburgh's Gold Award, the Robert M. Golden Medal for Excellence in Humanities and Creative Arts and the Alberta Centennial Medal. He also received the Annetta Dieckmann Award from the American Civil Liberties Union of Illinois where he founded the Young Advocates Program.

Publications 
 (Dis)Placing Khojas: Forging identities, revitalizing Islam and crafting global Ismailism 
 Kassam-Remtulla, Aly. Muslim Chaplaincy on Campus: Case Studies of Two American Universities. The United Kingdom, University of Oxford, 2012.
 Encounters: People of Asian Descent in the Americas,  
 Contours Of The Heart (Asian American Writers Worksh), 1998,

Footnotes 
 A Modern History of the Ismailis, Edited by Farhad Daftary, I.B.Tauris Publishers, London 2011.
 Miraly, Mohammad N.. Faith and World: Contemporary Ismaili Social and Political Thought. United States, iUniverse, 2016.
 Chakraborty, Tapas, and Pal, Adesh. Theorizing and Critiquing Indian Diaspora. India, Creative Books, 2004.
 Stanford. United States, Stanford Alumni Association, 2005.
 Encyclopedia of Muslim-American History. United States, Facts On File, Incorporated, 2010.
 The Upper Guinea Coast in Global Perspective. United Kingdom, Berghahn Books, 2016.
 Geo-economics and Geo-securities in the Indian Ocean Region. N.p., Taylor & Francis, 2018.
 Magout, Mohammad. A Reflexive Islamic Modernity: Academic Knowledge and Religious Subjectivity in the Global Ismaili Community. Germany, Ergon Verlag, 2020.
 Transnational and Cosmopolitan Forms of Islam in the West, by Karen Leonard 
 Canada and the Ismaili Imamat: Transnational Muslim Diplomacy and Multicultural Nationalism by Kais Khimji.
 Bolander, B. (2016). English and the transnational Ismaili Muslim community: Identity, the Aga Khan, and infrastructure. Language in Society, 45(4), 583–604. doi:10.1017/S0047404516000439
 From Satpanthi to Ismaili Muslim: The Articulation of Ismaili Khoja Identity in South Asia.
 Encyclopedia of Muslim-American History. The United States, Facts On File, Incorporated, 2010.
 Carter, Marina, and Torabully, Khal. Coolitude: An Anthology of the Indian Labour Diaspora. The United Kingdom, Anthem Press, 2002.
 Hirji, Karim F.. Growing Up with Tanzania: Memories, Musings, and Maths. Tanzania, Mkuki Na Nyota Publishers, 2014.

References 

American anthropologists
Stanford University alumni
Canadian Rhodes Scholars
Canadian people of Indian descent
American people of Indian descent
Living people
Year of birth missing (living people)